Peridaedala is a genus of moths belonging to the subfamily Olethreutinae of the family Tortricidae.

Species
Peridaedala algosa (Meyrick, 1912)
Peridaedala archaea Diakonoff, 1953
Peridaedala beryllina (Meyrick, 1925)
Peridaedala chlorissa (Meyrick, 1912)
Peridaedala crastidochroa Diakonoff, 1953
Peridaedala dendrochlora Diakonoff, 1968
Peridaedala enantiosema Diakonoff, 1983
Peridaedala hagna Diakonoff, 1948
Peridaedala hierograpta Meyrick, 1925
Peridaedala japonica Oku, 1979
Peridaedala melanantha Diakonoff, 1968
Peridaedala physoptila Diakonoff, 1968
Peridaedala prasina Diakonoff, 1953
Peridaedala speculata Razowski, 2013
Peridaedala stenoglypha Diakonoff, 1968
Peridaedala stenygra Razowski, 2013
Peridaedala thesaurophora Diakonoff, 1983
Peridaedala thylacophora Diakonoff, 1968
Peridaedala tonkinana Kuznetzov, 1988
Peridaedala triangulosa Diakonoff, 1983

See also
List of Tortricidae genera

References

External links
tortricidae.com

Eucosmini
Tortricidae genera
Taxa named by Edward Meyrick